Colcom may refer to:
 Colcom Foods, a meat-processing company in Zimbabwe
 Colcom Foundation, a charitable organization in the United States